KGLC (100.9 FM) is a radio station licensed to Miami, Oklahoma, United States. The station is currently owned by Mark Linn, through licensee Taylor Made Broadcasting Network, LLC.  The station has an Adult Contemporary format.

History
This station was assigned call sign KGLC on March 7, 1991. KORS on January 1, 1979 and KSSM on November 25, 1981.  Their slogan is "Radio on the 
Route."

References

External links
KGLC official website

GLC
Classic hits radio stations in the United States
Radio stations established in 1979
Miami, Oklahoma